Emilio Quaia is an Italian radiologist, academic, and author. He is a Professor of Radiology and the Director of the Radiology Department at the University of Padova.

Quaia is the editor of the book Contrast Media in Ultrasonography: Basic Principles and Clinical Applications (Medical Radiology), Radiological Imaging of the Kidney (Medical Radiology), and Imaging of the Liver and Intra-hepatic Biliary Tract (Medical Radiology). His research is focused in the field of Radiology, with a particular focus on contrast-enhanced ultrasound and liver, kidney and chest imaging.

Quaia is a European Society of Urogenital Radiology and ESGAR fellow. He is the Editor-in-chief of a health journal, Tomography and the Deputy Editor of Insights into Imaging.

Education
Quaia got MD at University of Udine in 1995 and completed his Radiology residency at University of Trieste. He completed his Master's in Management and Direction of Health Organizations from the University of Trento in 2011. He then pursued another Master's in Statistical Methods Applied to Clinical Questions from the University of Modena and completed it in 2016.

Career
Quaia started his academic career in 1999 as a research fellow at the Hammersmith Hospital London and worked there for a period of one year. He joined the Radiology department at the University of Trieste as an assistant professor in the same year and worked there up until 2014. He was then an Associate Professor of Radiology at University of Trieste from 2014 to 2016. In 2016, he was appointed as a Senior Lecturer and an Honorary Consultant in Radiology at the University of Edinburgh. In 2018, he moved to University of Padova, becoming a Professor.

Quaia has been the Radiology Department's Chief at the University of Padova since 2018.

Research
Quaia's research work focuses on Radiology with a particular focus on the fields of liver imaging, chest imaging, and contrast-enhanced ultrasound.

Sonography
Quaia studied ultrasound imaging techniques, with a particular focus on contrast-enhanced ultrasound techniques (CEUS), and suggested employing CEUS techniques to clinically assess a patient suffering from Crohn's disease. He also advocated its use for surgical and therapeutical management of a patient suffering from Chron's disease due to its increased specificity and high sensitivity in tracking inflammatory activity. He studied the impact of using contrast-enhanced ultrasound techniques in characterizing key liver lesions and demonstrated that post contrast agent administration, benign lesions depicted isoechoic effects in contrast to malignant lesions, which depicted hypoechoic effects, resulting in better characterization of focal liver lesions. He also evaluated the effects of contrast-enhanced and unenhanced sonography in malignancy diagnosis of composite cystic renal masses and established the effectiveness of the former in detecting malignant activity in composite indeterminate cystic renal masses.

Quaia also proposed the induction of micro-bubble-based agents to baseline ultrasound in an effort to enhance diagnostic capacity and suggested that the inclusion of microbubble-based agents can also help avoid MR examinations in various clinical situations. Moreover, he examined tissue perfusion via contrast-enhanced ultrasound. He suggested employing reperfusion kinetics to efficiently acquire semiquantitative parameters pertaining to local tissue perfusion, specifically in the brain, heart, and kidneys, along with measuring organ transit time post microbubble injection administration. He also investigated the characterization of renal parenchymal diseases, Ultrasound and Doppler Ultrasound for functional and morphological evaluation of renal parenchymal diseases citing their low sensitivity and specificity.

Liver imaging
Quaia studied contrast enhancement patterns using a contrast agent, Levovist and demonstrated that Levovist could help diagnose liver hemangiomas since it showed a progressive fill-in on an ultrasound scan. He also investigated the effects of radiotherapy on the biodistribution of Levovist on the liver and established that radiotherapy, at times, causes damage to the lining of blood vessels in the liver or Kupfer cells, which eventually affects the Levovist uptake. He also studied the magnetic resonance diffusion-weighted technique and its role in evaluating chemotherapy's effectiveness for liver metastases. He emphasized that the pre-treatment ADC value of a lesion is not resourceful in predicting the effectiveness of chemotherapy; however, an early increase in the ADC value combined with a dimensional decrease of a lesion does indicate the effectiveness of chemotherapy in liver metastases. He also examined the effects of contrast agents when administered in small amounts versus continuous infusion via a power injector. He demonstrated that the latter could help prolong the contrast enhancement period in the liver.

In another research, Quaia investigated the ideal time delay to examine liver metastases on contrast-enhanced ultrasound and proposed a 40-60 secs delaying window post contrast agent administration for ideal visibility, both in terms of signal intensity and visual appearance. He also explored the application of contrast-enhanced ultrasound in diagnosing pediatric liver problems, especially in the characterization of malignant and benign focal liver lesions. The study demonstrated that once the agent is injected into a vein, it stays in the blood vessels, streamlining the process of hepatic blood flow assessment.

Bibliography

Books
Contrast Media in Ultrasonography: Basic Principles and Clinical Applications (2005) ISBN 9783540407409
Radiological Imaging of the Kidney (2011) ISBN 9783642540479 
Imaging of the Liver and Intra-hepatic Biliary Tract (2021) ISBN 9783030389826

Selected articles
Quaia, E., & Bertolotto, M. (2002). Renal parenchymal diseases: is characterization feasible with ultrasound?. European radiology, 12(8), 2006–2020.
Quaia, E., Calliada, F., Bertolotto, M., Rossi, S., Garioni, L., Rosa, L., & Pozzi-Mucelli, R. (2004). Characterization of focal liver lesions with contrast-specific US modes and a sulfur hexafluoride–filled microbubble contrast agent: diagnostic performance and confidence. Radiology, 232(2), 420–430.
Quaia, E., D’Onofrio, M., Palumbo, A., Rossi, S., Bruni, S., & Cova, M. (2006). Comparison of contrast-enhanced ultrasonography versus baseline ultrasound and contrast-enhanced computed tomography in metastatic disease of the liver: diagnostic performance and confidence. European radiology, 16(7), 1599–1609.
Quaia, E. (2007). Microbubble ultrasound contrast agents: an update. European radiology, 17(8), 1995–2008.
Quaia, E., Bertolotto, M., Cioffi, V., Rossi, A., Baratella, E., Pizzolato, R., & Cova, M. A. (2008). Comparison of contrast-enhanced sonography with unenhanced sonography and contrast-enhanced CT in the diagnosis of malignancy in complex cystic renal masses. American Journal of Roentgenology, 191(4), 1239–1249.
Migaleddu, V., Scanu, A. M., Quaia, E., Rocca, P. C., Dore, M. P., Scanu, D., ... & Virgilio, G. (2009). Contrast-enhanced ultrasonographic evaluation of inflammatory activity in Crohn's disease. Gastroenterology, 137(1), 43–52.

References 

Year of birth missing (living people)
Living people
Italian radiologists
Italian academics
University of Udine alumni
University of Trento alumni
University of Modena alumni